Jack Morrison Gregory (14 August 1895 – 7 August 1973) was an Australian cricketer.

As well as 129 first class matches for New South Wales he played in 24 Tests between 1920 and 1928.  He was known mainly as a fearsome right-arm fast bowler but he also achieved a batting average of 36.50 and 1146 runs including two centuries, batting left-handed and gloveless. He also batted without a box. His best bowling was 7/69 in an innings and 8/101 in a match at the 1920/21 Test against England at the MCG.

At the Johannesburg Test in 1921 he scored a century from 67 balls in 70 minutes, which was at the time the fastest hundred in terms of both balls faced and minutes taken in the history of Test cricket. The record stood until 1985 when Viv Richards managed the feat with 56 balls but it remains the record for the fastest hundred in terms of minutes. His record of 15 catches in the 1920–21 Ashes series still stands as the record for the most catches by a fieldsman in a Test series.

Jack was the nephew of two of the very early Australian cricketers, Dave and Ned Gregory. A knee injury suffered in the 1928 Brisbane Test match brought his cricket career to an abrupt finish.

He was Wisden Cricketer of the Year in 1922.

References

External links

1895 births
1973 deaths
Australia Test cricketers
New South Wales cricketers
Wisden Cricketers of the Year
Wisden Leading Cricketers in the World
Australian cricketers
Cricketers from Sydney
Australian Imperial Force Touring XI cricketers
People educated at Sydney Church of England Grammar School